¡México Por Siempre! ("Forever Mexico"), stylized as ¡MÉXICO Por Siempre!, is the 20th studio album by Mexican singer Luis Miguel. The album was released by Warner Music Mexico on 24 November 2017. The album won two Latin Grammy Awards for Album of the Year and Best Ranchero/Mariachi Album. ¡México Por Siempre! also won the Grammy Award for Best Regional Mexican Music Album.

Promotion 

To promote ¡México por siempre!, Luis Miguel began his México Por Siempre Tour on 21 February 2018 at the National Auditorium in Mexico City. The tour totaled 150 concerts throughout the United States, Canada, Latin America and Spain and was confirmed by Billboard as the tour of the year and the most successful Latin tour worldwide.

Boxscore reported that the 2018 leg of Luis Miguel's México Por Siempre Tour was the highest-grossing Latin tour since the chart launched in 1990, pulling in $64.9 million from 613,000 tickets sold, and earning the Miguel a Latin American Music Award for tour of the year. He also broke his own record, performing 35 concerts in a tour at the National Auditorium in Mexico City, surpassing the 30 shows he did with the México En La Piel Tour in 2006.

Track listing

Personnel
Adapted from the ¡México Por Siempre! liner notes:

Performance credits

Mariachi Vargas De Tecalitlán
Carlos Martínez – director, first violin
Alberto Alfaro – violin
Miguel Ángel Barrón "Gigio" – violin
Andrés González – violin
Arturo Vargas – guitar
Enrique de Santiago – guitarrón
Gilberto Aguirre – vihuela
Gustavo Alvarado – trumpet
Jorge Aguayo – trumpet
Eduardo Serna – trumpet

Additional musicians
Armando Arellano – violin
Sergio Caratache – violin
Simón Casas – violin
Fernando Martínez – violin
Pepe Martínez Jr. – violin
Julio Serna – violin
Luke Maurer – viola
Michael Whitson – viola
Rodney Wirtz – viola
Alwyn Wright – viola
Vanessa Freebairn-Smith – cello
Alisha Bauer – cello
Giovanna Clayton – cello
Trevor Handy – cello
Chris Bleth – oboe
Heather Clark – flute
Stephen Kujala – flute
James Thatcher – french horn
Jenny Kim – french horn
Guillermo Acuña – harp 
Ramón Stagnaro – acoustic guitar 
David Reitzas – percussion 

Chorus 

Alberto Alfaro
Israel Bustos
Simón Casas
Andrés González
Carlos Martínez
Pepe Martínez Jr.
Jonathan Palomar
Arturo Vargas

Technical credits

Luis Miguel – producer
David Reitzas – co-producer, engineer, mixer, mastering engineer
Carlos Martínez – musical direction
Shari Sutcliffe – production coordinator
Jess Sutcliffe – orchestra recording
Jeremy Simoneaux – recording assistant and mixing
Wesley Seidman – recording assistant
Monique Evelyn – recording assistant
Greg Eliason – recording assistant
Eric Boulanger – mastering engineer
Omar Cruz – photography
Stephanie Hsu – graphic design
Ravali Yan – photography pages 10 & 11

Charts

Weekly charts

Year-end charts

Certifications

See also
2017 in Latin music
List of number-one albums of 2017 (Mexico)
List of number-one albums of 2018 (Mexico)

References

External links 
 Official site of the artist

Luis Miguel albums
2017 albums
Warner Music Mexico albums
Spanish-language albums
Albums produced by Luis Miguel
Latin Grammy Award winners for Album of the Year
Latin Grammy Award for Best Ranchero/Mariachi Album
Grammy Award for Best Regional Mexican Music Album (including Tejano)